Backbase is a Dutch banking technology financial technology company that provides engagement banking for financial institutions globally from large banks to credit unions and community banks. Backbase provides solutions for retail banking, business banking and wealth management.

History 
Backbase was founded in 2003 in Amsterdam by Jouk Pleiter and Gerbert Kaandorp. The company originally produced a AJAX framework, based on HTML, JavaScript and CSS. This eventually took the form of the Backbase Customer Experience Portal Backbase originally sold to a wide range of internet-facing businesses, including financial services, but in 2013, Pleiter pivoted the company to focus solely on financial services. In 2017, Pleiter's work at Backbase was recognized with the LOEY Award, the prize for the best online entrepreneur in the Netherlands.

The business expanded globally in the following years, with offices in several countries. Backbase employs around 2000 staff globally.

In 2021, Backbase announced a strategic partnership with Microsoft, which sees Backbase's Engagement Banking Platform serving in the engagement layer within Microsoft Cloud for Financial Services.

In June 2022, Backbase received investment of €120 million from US-base private equity firm, Motive Partners, giving Backbase a valuation of €2.5 billion.

References

Companies based in Amsterdam
Companies established in 2003